Ignacio Huguet (born 4 November 1944) is a Cuban former sports shooter. He competed in the skeet event at the 1968 Summer Olympics.

References

1944 births
Living people
Cuban male sport shooters
Olympic shooters of Cuba
Shooters at the 1968 Summer Olympics
Sportspeople from Havana
Pan American Games medalists in shooting
Pan American Games gold medalists for Cuba
Pan American Games silver medalists for Cuba
Shooters at the 1967 Pan American Games
20th-century Cuban people